Volley Callipo is a professional volleyball team based in Vibo Valentia, Italy. The club plays in SuperLega (previous Serie A1), highest level of the Italian Volleyball League. In season 2017/18 the club is named Tonno Callipo Calabria Vibo Valentia.

Achievements
 Italian Cup Serie A2
  (x4) 2003, 2015, 2016, 2023

History
The club was founded in 1993 in Italian Vibo Valentia by Filippo Callipo. In 2004 was promoted to Serie A1, but in 2007 fell down to Serie A2. After one season came back to Serie A1. In 2014-2016 the club spent in Serie A2, because of Serie A1 reorganization. In these two seasons club won two Italian Cups Serie A2. Since 2016, Tonno Callipo Vibo Valentia has been playing in SuperLega (previous Serie A1). Also in June 2016, was chosen new Argentine head coach Waldo Kantor.

Team
Team roster - season 2022/2023

References

External links

 LegaVolley squad

Italian volleyball clubs